Silver Jubilee Bus Terminus or Erode Central Bus Station is a terminal bus station located in the City of Erode, Tamil Nadu, India. It is located near Swastik Circle at the junction of Mettur Road and Sathy Road about 3 km north of Erode Junction Railway Station. It is the third largest bus terminus in Tamil Nadu followed by Chennai Koyambedu and Madurai Mattuthavani bus stations.

History
The Central Bus Station was established in 1973 and named Independence day Silver Jubilee Bus Terminus to commemorate the Silver Jubilee celebrations of the Indian Independence. Though it was opened for operations in 1973, the main terminal building facility opened only in 1980. It is followed by the opening of second terminal building in 1982 and further expanded in the year of 2003 with separate terminal for Town (Intra-city) bus services. Later in 2011, a dedicated terminal facility has been opened for catering to Intra-city Minibus services. The Bus station is located at the heart of the City, with two Entry and two Exit Gates. Erode City Municipal Corporation owns the property and takes care of its maintenance.

Operations and Traffic
This Class-A Bus Station caters to both intra-city and inter-city services with 8 bus fingers, 13 platforms and 120 bus bays. The Station is an Integrated facility operating with three terminals namely, Mofussil bus Stand, City bus Stand and Minibus Stand. The Mofussil Terminal has 75 bus bays for Outstation buses (5 platforms each having 15 bays). The Town bus Terminal has 35 parallel bus bays in 6 platforms for Intra-city buses and the Minibus Terminal has 10 bays in single bus finger for intra-city minibus services. Buses ply from here to all major towns in Tamil Nadu and other important places in Karnataka, Kerala, Andhra Pradesh and Puducherry. Around 40,000 to 50,000 passengers were catered by this terminal every day in 2006. As on 2014, this terminal handles around 4200 bus services with a share of 2530 Mofussil (Intercity bus services) and 1640 City bus services. Apart from this there are 65 Minibuses operating multiple services from this station and there are around 268 private buses being operated.

Facilities

The bus station is modernized with concrete flooring, high mast lamps and the introduction of various extension counters, e-governance facilities and bank ATMs.

An air conditioned passenger waiting hall, a reverse osmosis water treatment plant and a separate station for mini-buses are in operation. An underground parking facility has been constructed for two-wheelers and a multi level shopping complex has been developed along with additional public convenience facilities inside the complex.

Additional Satellite Bus Terminals
Owing to the congestion and narrow access roads in the core area of the city, Erode City Municipal Corporation has decided to construct two satellite bus terminals for handling of intercity bus services as a measure to reduce the traffic flow in core city. One in the South at Solar along Karur Highway near Southern ORR with a capacity to handle 1200 mofussil services bound for South TN and Central TN districts; while another terminal will be established near Kaniravutharkulam on the way to Chithode along Sathyamangalam Highway near Western Bypass with a capacity to handle 900 mofussil services bound for Western TN districts and Omni bus services. While there are two other small terminals in the city limits at Surampatti and 46-Pudur which are established to cater intra-city bus services.

Solar Bus stand and Periyasemur Bus stand

Recently, the State Minister for Housing and Urban Development have announced that two new Bus Terminals will be established in Erode to reduce traffic congestion. One at Solar near Lakkapuram along Karur Road on 24 acres land and the other at Periyasemur (near Kanirowther Kulam) along Sathy Road on 15 acres of land.

Renovation
The Central Bus Station is being renovated and redeveloped under the Central Government supported Smart City Mission at a cost of Rs.40 Crore. During this reconstruction period, there will be two temporary bus stands functioning one each at Solar and Sathy Road.

See also
 Transport in Erode
 Erode Junction railway station
 Outer Ring Road, Erode

References

C
Transport in Erode